Robert Healing (31 October 1873 – 23 May 1950) was a Jamaican cricketer. He played in six first-class matches for the Jamaican cricket team in 1896/97.

See also
 List of Jamaican representative cricketers

References

External links
 

1873 births
1950 deaths
Jamaican cricketers
Jamaica cricketers
People from Tewkesbury